Tepeçaylek is a village in Tarsus  district of Mersin Province, Turkey. At    it is situated in Çukurova (Cilicia of the antiquity) no the north of  Çukurova motorway. The population of Tepeçaylak is 190  as of 2012. The main crop of the village is grape.

References

Villages in Tarsus District